Historical demography is the quantitative study of human population in the past. It is concerned with population size, with the three basic components of population change (fertility, mortality, and migration), and with population characteristics related to those components, such as marriage, socioeconomic status, and the configuration of families.

Sources
The sources of historical demography vary according to the period and topics of the study.

For the recent period - beginning in the early nineteenth century in most European countries, and later in the rest of the world - historical demographers make use of data collected by governments, including censuses and vital statistics.

In the early modern period, historical demographers rely heavily on ecclesiastical records of baptisms, marriages, and burials, using methods developed by French historian Louis Henry, as well as hearth and poll tax records. In 1749 the first population census covering the whole country was conducted in the kingdom of Sweden, including today's Finland.

For population size, sources can also include the size of cities and towns, the size and density of smaller settlements, relying on field survey techniques, the presence or absence of agriculture on marginal land, and inferences from historical records. For population health and life expectancy, paleodemography, based on the study of skeletal remains, is another important approach for populations that precede the modern era, as is the study of ages of death recorded on funerary monuments.

The PUMS (Public User Microdata Samples) data set allows researchers to analyze contemporary and historical data sets.

Development of  techniques
Historical analysis has played a central role in the study of population, from Thomas Malthus in the eighteenth century to major twentieth-century demographers such as Ansley Coale and Samuel H. Preston. The French historian Louis Henry (1911-1991) was chiefly responsible for the development of historical demography as a distinct subfield of demography. In recent years, new research in historical demography has proliferated owing to the development of massive new population data collections, including the Demographic Data Base in Umeå, Sweden, the Historical Sample of the Netherlands, and the Integrated Public Use Microdata Series (IPUMS).

According to Willigan and Lynch, the main sources used by demographic historians include archaeological methods, parish registers starting about 1500 in Europe, civil registration records, enumerations, national census beginning about 1800, genealogies and family reconstruction studies, population registers, and organizational and institutional records.  Statistical methods have included model life tables, time series analysis, event history analysis, causal model building and hypothesis testing, As well as theories of the demographic transition and the epidemiological transition.

References

Further reading
 Alter, George C. "Generation to Generation Life Course, Family, and Community." Social Science History (2013) 37#1 pp: 1-26. abstract
 Alter, George C., et al. "Introduction: Longitudinal analysis of historical-demographic data." Journal of Interdisciplinary History (2012) 42#4 pp: 503-517. Online
 Alter, George C., et al.  "Completing Life Histories with Imputed Exit Dates: A Method for Historical Data from Passive Registration Systems," Population (2009) 64:293–318.
 Arriaga, Eduardo E. "A New Approach to the Measurements of Urbanization" Economic Development & Cultural Change (1970) 18#2 pp 206–18 in JSTOR
 Coale, Ansley J. Regional Model Life Tables and Stable Populations (2nd ed. 1983)
 Fauve-Chamoux, Antoinette. "A Personal Account of the History of Historical Demography in Europe at the End of the Glorious Thirty (1967-1975)." Essays in Economic & Business History 35.1 (2017): 175-205.
 Gutmann, Myron P. et al. eds. Navigating Time and Space in Population Studies (2012) excerpt and text search
 Henry, Louis. Population: analysis and models (London: Edward Arnold, 1976)
 Henry, Louis. On the measurement of human fertility: selected writings of Louis Henry (Elsevier Pub. Co, 1972)
 Henry, Louis. "The verification of data in historical demography." Population studies 22.1 (1968): 61-81.
 Nusteling, Hubert. "Fertility in historical demography and a homeostatic method for reconstituting populations in pre-statistical periods." Historical Methods: A Journal of Quantitative and Interdisciplinary History (2005) 38#3 pp: 126-142. DOI:10.3200/HMTS.38.3.126-142
 Smith, Daniel Scott. "A perspective on demographic methods and effects in social history." William and Mary Quarterly (1982 ): 442-468. in JSTOR
 Reher, David S., and Roger Schofield. Old and new methods in historical demography (Clarendon Press 1993), 426 pp.
 Swanson,  David A.  and Jacob S. Siegel. The Methods and Materials of Demography (2nd ed. 2004); rewritten version of Henry S. Shryock and Jacob S. Siegel, The Methods and Materials of Demography (1976); compendium of techniques
 Swedlund, Alan C. "Historical demography as population ecology." Annual Review of Anthropology (1978) pp: 137-173.
 van de Walle, Etienne. "Historical Demography" in Dudley L. Poston and Michael Micklin, eds. Handbook of Population (Springer US, 2005) pp 577–600
 Watkins, Susan Cotts, and Myron P. Gutmann. "Methodological issues in the use of population registers for fertility analysis." Historical Methods: A Journal of Quantitative and Interdisciplinary History (1983) 16#3: 109-120.
 Willigan, J. Dennis,  and Katherine A. Lynch, Sources and Methods of Historical Demography, (New York: Academic Press, 1982)   505 p. Abstract
 Wrigely, E. A., ed. An Introduction to English Historical Demography, London: Weidenfeld & Nicolson, 1966.

External links
 International Commission for Historical Demography
 H-Demog, an international scholarly online discussion list on demographic history
 POPULATION STATISTICS in historical perspective

Fields of history
Population